MSG Sphere at The Venetian is a sphere-shaped music and entertainment arena being built in Paradise, Nevada, near the Las Vegas Strip and east of the Venetian resort. The 17,500-seat auditorium was initially scheduled to open in 2021, but construction was suspended in April 2020 due to a disruption in the project's supply chain, caused by the COVID-19 pandemic. Construction resumed later that year, and the opening is scheduled for September 2023.

History

Background
The MSG Sphere arena was announced in February 2018, and is being built in partnership between the Madison Square Garden Company (MSG) and Las Vegas Sands Corporation. The MSG Sphere is located east of Las Vegas Sands' Venetian resort and just off the Las Vegas Strip. The sphere-shaped venue will have a capacity of 17,500 and feature the world's largest LED screen. Las Vegas Sands contributed the  site for the project. The sphere was designed by Populous. The property will include 304 parking spaces, while additional spaces will be available at the parking garages for the nearby Venetian, Palazzo, and Venetian Expo.

Construction
A groundbreaking ceremony was held on September 27, 2018, and was attended by approximately 300 people, including Las Vegas Sands' Sheldon Adelson and Nevada governor Brian Sandoval. In November 2018, it was reported that the MSG Sphere would be built along with new bars, private suites, a museum and retail space. AECOM began working on the site in February 2019, through a preliminary agreement. AECOM had worked on several other stadiums, including the T-Mobile Arena in Las Vegas. Excavation was underway in March 2019. Approximately  of dirt and caliche were excavated to prepare the site for construction. AECOM was named as the general contractor in June 2019. The project had 400 construction workers. This number was expected to eventually reach a peak of 1,500. Construction of the basement was underway in July 2019. MSG estimated that the project would cost $1.2 billion, while AECOM projected the costs at $1.7 billion. Negotiations were underway to lower the costs.

By October 2019, construction crews had completed the  basement as well as the first ground level of the sphere. The basement area will be used as public space for events. Excavation went as deep as 21 feet for construction of the basement. In December 2019, the sphere reached 65 feet in height with the completion of a fourth level.

In February 2020, MSG said that the cost of the project had been increased to $1.66 billion as a result of design changes consisting of guest enhancements. That month, the world's fourth-largest crane was set up on the site's northeast side for the purpose of lifting heavy construction materials. The crane is capable of standing up to 580 feet. In a disassembled state, the crane was transported across the Atlantic Ocean from Zeebrugge, Belgium to Port Hueneme, California. The crane then required 120 tractor-trailers to transport it to Las Vegas. A separate crane was required to assemble the main crane, a process which took 18 days. In March 2020, construction reached the widest point of the sphere, the 516-foot diameter, located at the sixth level and 108 feet above ground.

MSG Sphere is expected to create 4,400 jobs upon opening. The project had been scheduled to open in 2021. On March 31, 2020, MSG announced that construction would be suspended due to the COVID-19 pandemic. The project experienced a disruption in its supply chain, a result of the pandemic, and this hindered construction progress. All construction work on the project was expected to come to a stop over the next two weeks following the announcement. In August 2020, MSG Entertainment announced that construction had resumed on the project, with the opening rescheduled for 2023. Over the subsequent 15 months, construction would be focused on concrete, followed by steel erection and then the 13,000-ton steel-domed roof, the most complex part of the project. In October 2020, crews completed the heaviest lift up to that point, with the installation of two 240-ton steel girders.

MSG took over as general contractor in December 2020, although AECOM continued to provide support. A 170-ton steel compression ring was added in February 2021, marking the heaviest lift of the entire project. Due to its size, the ring had to be assembled at the construction site. Work crews spent three weeks welding and bolting the prefabricated steel pieces together, and the crane was then used to lift the ring into place.

Roof, exosphere, and interior
The dome's roof required 3,000 tons of steel. The roof started to take shape in March 2021, as crews began the installation of 32 trusses, each one weighing 100 tons. Truss installation reached the midway point in May 2021, and the crane had to be moved to the southern side of the property to install the remainder. Because of its size, the crane's relocation took two days. It was announced a few days later that the projected cost of the MSG Sphere had increased to $1.826 billion. The cost had already been expected to increase as construction proceeded.

The dome was topped off on June 18, 2021, and work was already underway on an external exosphere which would be built around the dome. The exosphere will be made of LED light panels which will be visible from several miles away. It will be 30 percent taller than the dome. Work on the sphere's interior began in August 2021, with the project now estimated to cost $1.865 billion.

Upon completion of  the roof's steel frame, 6,000 cubic yards of concrete were then pumped onto the roof. This formed a layer measuring 10 inches in thickness, and weighing approximately 10,000 tons. The roof was finished in October 2021. Crews then turned their focus to a 730-ton steel interior frame which will support the LED screens and audio system. Work on the interior frame was expected to continue into 2022.

A second topping out, for the exosphere, took place on May 24, 2022. This was followed by installation of the interior and exterior LED screens. Later in the year, construction costs increased again, reaching $2.175 billion. The latest increase was due to global supply chain issues and the 2021–2022 inflation surge.

Features
It will include seating for 17,500 people, and all seats will have high speed internet access. The venue can accommodate 20,000 people in standing capacity. The sphere has nine levels, including the basement, where a VIP club will be located. A total of 23 suites will be included, across the third and fifth floors.

The MSG Sphere will be equipped with 19,000 by 13,500 resolution LED screens which will spread across the interior of the venue. The wraparound screen will measure . It will be the largest and highest-resolution LED screen in the world. The exterior of the venue will feature  of programmable lighting, which can be modified based on holidays, for example to depict the sphere as a Halloween pumpkin or a Christmas snow globe. The sphere will feature 164,000 speakers, and the sound system will deliver sound through the floorboards. 4D features, including scent and wind, will also be used.

The arena will primarily host awards shows and concerts, in addition to other entertainment events. Although it was not designed to host sporting events, there is the possibility of hosting matches for boxing and mixed martial arts, as well as esports tournaments.

A 1,000-foot pedestrian bridge will connect the sphere to the Venetian Expo, and there are plans to build a new Las Vegas Monorail station to serve the MSG Sphere and The Venetian. However, these plans were put on hold in April 2020, due to the financial impact of the pandemic.

Other locations

An identical MSG Sphere is planned to be built in Stratford, East London, and MSG intends to build others around the world.

MSG Sphere Studios
MSG Sphere Studios opened in Burbank, California in May 2022. The facility handles production and post-production work for the Las Vegas sphere and future spheres. MSG Sphere Studios sought to collaborate with filmmakers and musicians to create some of the content for the Las Vegas sphere. Ted King, who previously worked on Star Trek: The Experience, is among those who will create visual content for the MSG Sphere. The studio will also produce content in association with the 2023 Las Vegas Grand Prix, which will travel past the MSG Sphere.

The spherical studio facility, nearly 100 feet tall, is a miniature version of the Las Vegas sphere.

See also
Avicii Arena
Cinematic virtual reality
T-Mobile Arena, the home of the NHL's Vegas Golden Knights
All Net Resort and Arena, a Las Vegas arena under construction and planned to open in 2025

References

External links

 Official website

Buildings and structures in Paradise, Nevada
Indoor arenas in Las Vegas
Music venues in the Las Vegas Valley
Sports venues in Las Vegas
Boxing venues in Las Vegas
Las Vegas Strip
Indoor arenas under construction in the United States